Korkor (also Romanized as Korḵor) is a village in Shirvan Rural District, in the Central District of Borujerd County, Lorestan Province, Iran. At the 2006 census, its population was 40, in nine families.

References 

Towns and villages in Borujerd County